Defending champion Margaret Court defeated Kerry Melville in the final, 6–3, 6–1 to win the women's singles tennis title at the 1970 Australian Open. It was her ninth Australian Open title, her second consecutive major singles title and her seventeenth major singles title overall. It was also the first step in an eventual Grand Slam for Court, the first in women's singles in the Open Era.

Seeds
All seeds receive a bye into the second round.

Draw

Finals

Top half

Section 1

Section 2

Bottom half

Section 3

Section 4

External links
 1970 Australian Open – Women's draws and results at the International Tennis Federation

Women's singles
Australian Open (tennis) by year – Women's singles
1970 in Australian women's sport
1970 in women's tennis